is a private junior college in the city of Kashihara in Nara Prefecture, Japan. It was established in 1966.

External links
 Official website 

Educational institutions established in 1966
Private universities and colleges in Japan
Universities and colleges in Nara Prefecture
1966 establishments in Japan
Japanese junior colleges